Musée national des Arts et Traditions Populaires may refer to:
 Musée national des Arts et Traditions Populaires (Algeria)
 Musée national des Arts et Traditions Populaires (France)